Falard District is in Lordegan County, Chaharmahal and Bakhtiari province, Iran. At the 2006 census, its population was 30,254 in 6,257 households. The following census in 2011 counted 32,944 people in 8,033 households. At the latest census in 2016, the district had 33,023 inhabitants living in 9,285 households.

References 

Lordegan County

Districts of Chaharmahal and Bakhtiari Province

Populated places in Chaharmahal and Bakhtiari Province

Populated places in Lordegan County